The Wallace High School is an 11–18 co-educational voluntary grammar school and sixth form in Lisburn, County Antrim, Northern Ireland.

History 
It was founded in 1880 by a bequest from the estate of Sir Richard Wallace, local landowner, Unionist MP and philanthropist, and was originally named Lisburn Intermediate and University School. It was built on a site fronting the Antrim Road. A board of trustees took charge in 1900 to oversee the development of the growing school and, when they renamed it in 1942 in memory of its founder, they adopted the word Esperance (Hope) as the school's motto from the Wallace coat of arms.

The post-war years witnessed rapid growth in pupil numbers and consequent accommodation provision. Land was purchased at Clonevin Park, initially for playing fields, and when the Antrim Road site proved inadequate, the decision was taken to build a new school in these extensive grounds.

Pupils and staff moved to the new building in 1976, and today the school has expanded to 1160 pupils in the grammar school and 200 in the preparatory department.

School enhancement 
The Wallace High School underwent construction on a new school expansion project. This included construction of a new two storey extension which includes the subjects of Art, Home Economics, and Moving Image Arts which was finish by the end of December 2017 and officially unveiled on 4 October 2018 . There is a fitness suite which was also unveiled on 4 October which included four power racks, a free weights area with weight-lifting platforms, a blue astro-turf track for conditioning and warm-ups, plate loaded resistance machines and cardio equipment. It also included new changing rooms, new showers and hairdryers. A technology extension is also completed, beginning in February 2018 and concluding in August 2018.

Existing 'mobile' classrooms, of which there are four, have been relocated to allow space for the expansion project. These mobile classrooms include the subjects of English, Maths, Modern Languages, Religious Education, among others.

Sport

Rugby 
Wallace is well known in the Northern Irish schools’ rugby scene, despite having never won the Ulster Schools Cup. They have reached the final 5 times, (most recently in 2015) and they are one of eight schools who enters in the fourth round of the cup along with Ballyclare High School, Ballymena Academy, Campbell College, Enniskillen Royal Grammar School, Methodist College Belfast, Royal Belfast Academical Institution and The Royal School, Armagh.

Hockey 
Wallace High School is noted for men's hockey with wins in the Burney Cup, McCullough Cup and a single win in the All Ireland Championship in 1987-88. In 2011 the hockey girls created history by reaching the final of the Ulster Senior Schoolgirls' Cup for the first time, only to lose on penalties.

Notable alumni 

 Shauna Lowry, TV personality
 The Rt. Hon. Brian Maginess (1901–1967), government minister in the Stormont Parliament
 Drew Nelson (1956-2016), Grand Secretary of the Orange Order
 Edwin Poots, current minister in the Northern Ireland Executive
 Blu Hydrangea, winner of RuPaul's Drag Race: UK vs the World

Sport

Rugby
 Chris Henry, professional rugby player for Ulster and Ireland
 Nevin Spence (1990-2012), professional rugby player for Ulster
 Jacob Stockdale, professional rugby player for Ulster and Ireland
 Nathan Doak, professional rugby player for Ulster
 Ian Whitten, professional rugby player for AVIVA Premiership Club Exeter, formerly Ulster

Cricket
 Neil Doak, Irish cricketer and Irish rugby squad member
 Raymond Hunter, Irish cricketer, Irish rugby and British & Irish Lions
 Thomas Martin (1911-1937), cricketer
 Jack Simpson (1920-1997), cricketer

References

External links 
 

Lisburn
Grammar schools in County Antrim
Educational institutions established in 1880
1880 establishments in Ireland